National Commission for Religious and Linguistic Minorities, also called Ranganath Misra Commission, was constituted by Government of India on 29 October 2004 to look into various issues related to Linguistic and Religious minorities in India. It was chaired by former Chief Justice of India Justice Ranganath Misra. The commission submitted the report to the Government on 21 May 2007.

Terms of reference
Initially, the commission was entrusted with the following terms of reference:
 To suggest criteria for identification of socially and economically backward sections among religious and linguistic minorities;
 To recommend measures for welfare of socially and economically backward sections among religious and linguistic minorities, including reservation in education and government employment; and
 To suggest the constitutional, legal and administrative modalities required for the implementation of its recommendations.

After nearly five months of its work the Commission’s Terms of Reference were modified so as to add the following:

To give its recommendations on the issues raised in WPs 180/04 and 94/05 filed in the Supreme Court of India, and in certain High Courts, relating to Para 3 of the Constitution (Scheduled Castes) Order 1950 in the context of the ceiling of 50 percent on reservations, as also the modalities for inclusion in the list of Scheduled Castes.

Main recommendations
 Give 10% quotas for Muslims and 5% for other minorities in government jobs and in seats in all the higher educational institutions (graduation and above)
 Reserve 8.4% quota out of the existing OBC quota of 27% for religious minorities, mainly Muslims
 Permit Dalits who convert to Islam or Christianity to avail of reservation benefits under the Scheduled Caste reservation quota.

Leaked
TwoCircles.net, an online Indian news organization has started publishing excerpts from this report since June 2009.

Opposition
Since the submission India's national party, BJP has been opposing the Ranganath Misra's recommendation fiercely. In 2010, BJP's senior official and CM of Madhya Pradesh Shivraj Singh Chouhan stated "prime minister Jawaharlal Nehru had opposed reservation for converted SCs and STs". In 2011, The BJP decided to file a PIL against a report recommending Scheduled Caste quotas for all minorities that could lead to Dalit Christians and Muslims coming within its ambit. On 9 February 2014, Narendra Modi during his prime-ministerial campaign in Kerala he critisied Mishra's report for creating "insecurities of the Dalit communities".

References

External links
Misra Commission Report Part-1
Misra Commission Report Part-2
TwoCircles.net publishes excerpts from the Misra Commission report
BJP slams against Ranganath Mishra commission report
India’s Downtrodden Muslims

2007 in India
Indian commissions and inquiries
Manmohan Singh administration
Minorities-focussed government initiatives in India
Linguistic minorities